Toussaint Michael Chiza, better known as Tusse, is a Congolese-Swedish singer who represented Sweden in the Eurovision Song Contest 2021.

Life and career
Chiza was born in the Democratic Republic of the Congo When he was five years old he had to flee his country. He lived in Uganda in a refugee camp with his aunt for three years. He came to Sweden with his aunt as a refugee at just 8 years old. In Sweden, he started to live with a family in the village of Kullsbjörken where he has resided since 2015. He participated as a singer in the Swedish talent show Talang 2018 (as Tousin Chiza) which was also broadcast on TV4; he made it to the semifinals before being eliminated. He received praise for his semifinal performance from judge Bianca Ingrosso. Tusse was a finalist in Swedish Idol 2019, broadcast on TV4, alongside Freddie Liljegren, and was ultimately declared the winner in the final.

After winning Swedish Idol, he released three singles, two of them songs he performed on Idol: a cover of "How Will I Know" on 22 November 2019 as a Top 12 contestant. And as the winner, he released his version of the season's winning song, "Rain", on 3 December 2019. As a result of his victory, he got to release his debut single as a CD single as well as on the iTunes Store. His third single is called "Innan du går"

Tusse participated in Melodifestivalen 2021 with the song "Voices". He qualified directly to the final, scheduled for 13 March 2021, and ultimately won with 175 points. As a result, he represented Sweden in the Eurovision Song Contest 2021 in Rotterdam, the Netherlands.
After his first Eurovision rehearsal Tusse was the victim of racist comments on social media.

In the semi-final Tusse managed to qualify for the final on 22 May. In the final he reached 14th place with his song. After Eurovision, he did an interview with the magazine Vanity Teen in which he talked about his personal life, his experience in Eurovision and his future career.

Discography

Singles

Notes

References

External links 

Living people
2002 births
Idol (Swedish TV series) winners
Idol (Swedish TV series) participants
Democratic Republic of the Congo emigrants to Sweden
Eurovision Song Contest entrants of 2021
Eurovision Song Contest entrants for Sweden
21st-century Swedish singers
21st-century Swedish male singers
Refugees in Sweden
Talang (Swedish TV series) contestants
Melodifestivalen contestants of 2021